The 1919 Kentucky Derby was the 45th running of the Kentucky Derby. The race took place on May 10, 1919. Winner Sir Barton went on to win in the Preakness and Belmont Stakes, becoming the first winner of the American Triple Crown.

Pre-race coverage
A New York Times writer believed that the Preakness Stakes was competing for attention with the Derby, as it was held four days following the Derby and offered a purse of $30,000, larger than the Derby's $20,000. The author felt that the three-year old racing horses during the 1919 season were a "good crop" and that the course record of 2: set by Old Rosebud in 1914 could be broken. Sennings Park, a horse who stayed through the winter at Churchill Downs, ran a mile at the track in 1:43 3/5, the best time of the season in late April.

Result

Winning Breeder: John E. Madden & Vivian A. Gooch; (KY)
Horses Corson and Clermont scratched before the race.

Aftermath

For the first time in race history two horses from the same owner finished in first and second place. In addition, Ross became the first Canadian owner to have a horse win the Kentucky Derby.

References

Endnotes

Citations

Bibliography

1919
Kentucky Derby
Derby
May 1919 sports events